Wei, known in historiography as the Eastern Wei, was an imperial dynasty of China that followed the disintegration of the Northern Wei dynasty. One of the Northern dynasties during the Northern and Southern dynasties period, the Eastern Wei ruled the eastern part of northern China from 534 to 550. As with the Northern Wei, the ruling family of the Eastern Wei were members of the Tuoba clan of the Xianbei.

History
Gao Huan was the potentate of the eastern half of what was Northern Wei territory. In 534, following the disintegration of the Northern Wei dynasty, he installed Yuan Shanjian as ruler of Eastern Wei. Yuan Shanjian was a descendant of the Northern Wei.  Yuan Shanjian was a puppet ruler, as the real power lay in the hands of Gao Huan. Several military campaigns, such as the Battle of Shayuan, were launched against the neighboring Western Wei in an attempt to reunify the territory once held by the Northern Wei, however these campaigns were not successful. In 547 Gao Huan died. His sons Gao Cheng and Gao Yang were able to pursue his policy of controlling the emperor, but in 550 Gao Yang deposed Yuan Shanjian and founded his own dynasty, the Northern Qi.

Art
The Buddhist art of the Eastern Wei displays a combination of Greco-Buddhist influences from Gandhara and Central Asia (representations of flying figures holding wreaths, Greek-style folds of the drapery), together with Chinese artistic influences.

References

Citations

Sources 

 Book of Wei
 History of Northern Dynasties
 Zizhi Tongjian

Dynasties in Chinese history
Former countries in Chinese history
States and territories established in the 530s
States and territories disestablished in the 550s
534 establishments
6th-century establishments in China
550 disestablishments
6th-century disestablishments in China
Tuoba